Lionhead Studios was a British video game developer located in Guildford, England. It was founded in July 1997 by Peter Molyneux, Mark Webley, Tim Rance, and Steve Jackson, following their departure from Bullfrog Productions, which Molyneux had co-founded in 1987. In 2001 it released its first title, the real-time strategy game Black & White; over the next year it launched deals with independent studios Big Blue Box Studios and Intrepid Computer Entertainment, who were developing Fable and B.C., respectively, to serve as a producer for their games. In 2002, after helping them sign publishing deals with Microsoft Game Studios, Lionhead purchased the companies outright, though they continued as satellite studios working on their games. After the launch and success of the action role-playing game Fable in 2004, however, at the urging of Microsoft B.C. was cancelled and Intrepid shut down, and Unity, a collaboration between Lionhead Studios and Llamasoft, was also cancelled. The following year Lionhead released the games they had been developing at their main studio, Black & White 2 and business simulation game The Movies, neither of which were as successful as the company's first two titles. Lionhead had financial difficulties as a result, and was purchased by Microsoft Game Studios in 2006.

Over the next decade, Lionhead only released titles in the Fable series; although several other projects were worked on, such as Project Dimitri, Survivors, and Project Milo, sometimes for years, none turned into published products. Lionhead released five titles in the series between 2008 and 2012, including action role-playing games, a beat 'em up game, and a tie-in minigame pack. Molyneux, the face of the company, left in 2012, before the company's final two games were released that year. In 2016, with no further titles finished, the studio was shut down by Microsoft, cancelling its in-progress projects Fable Fortune and Fable Legends, the latter while in closed beta. During its lifetime Lionhead Studios released nine games, primarily for Microsoft Windows personal computers and Xbox consoles, and worked on at least ten other titles which were cancelled in various stages of development.

Games

Cancelled

References

External links

 
Lionhead Studios